Benito Báez (born May 6, 1977) is a professional baseball pitcher who played for one season in the major leagues. He pitched for the Florida Marlins for eight games during the 2001 Florida Marlins season. In 2008, he pitched for the Newark Bears in the Atlantic League of Professional Baseball. He now is coaching freshman baseball with Grand Rapids Christian High School in Grand Rapids, Michigan.

External links

1977 births
Arizona League Athletics players
Atlantic League Road Warriors players
Calgary Cannons players
Chattanooga Lookouts players
Dominican Republic expatriate baseball players in Canada
Dominican Republic expatriate baseball players in the United States
Florida Marlins players
Huntsville Stars players
Gulf Coast Marlins players
Jupiter Hammerheads players
Living people
Major League Baseball pitchers
Major League Baseball players from the Dominican Republic
Midland RockHounds players
Newark Bears players
People from Bonao
Vancouver Canadians players
Visalia Oaks players
West Michigan Whitecaps players